There were three types of camps for Japanese and Japanese-American civilians in the United States during World War II. Civilian Assembly Centers were temporary camps, frequently located at horse tracks, where Japanese Americans were sent as they were removed from their communities. Eventually, most were sent to Relocation Centers, also known as internment camps. Detention camps housed Nikkei considered to be disruptive or of special interest to the government.

Civilian Assembly Centers
 Arcadia, California (Santa Anita Racetrack, stables) (Santa Anita assembly center)
 Fresno, California (Fresno Fairgrounds, racetrack, stables)
 Marysville / Arboga, California (migrant workers' camp)
 Mayer, Arizona (Civilian Conservation Corps camp)
 Merced, California (county fairgrounds)
 Owens Valley, California
 Parker Dam, Arizona
 Pinedale, California (Pinedale Assembly Center, warehouses)
 Pomona, California (Los Angeles County Fairgrounds, racetrack, stables) (Pomona assembly center)
 Portland, Oregon (Pacific International Livestock Exposition, including 3,800 housed in the main pavilion building)
 Puyallup, Washington (fairgrounds racetrack stables, Informally known as "Camp Harmony")
 Sacramento, California Camp Kohler (Site of Present-Day Walerga Park) (migrant workers' camp)
 Salinas, California (fairgrounds, racetrack, stables)
 San Bruno, California (Tanforan racetrack, stables)
 Stockton, California (San Joaquin County Fairgrounds, racetrack, stables)
 Tulare, California (fairgrounds, racetrack, stables)
 Turlock, California (Stanislaus County Fairgrounds)
 Woodland, California

Relocation Centers

 Gila River War Relocation Center, Arizona
 Granada War Relocation Center, Colorado (AKA "Amache")
 Heart Mountain War Relocation Center, Wyoming
 Jerome War Relocation Center, Arkansas
 Manzanar War Relocation Center, California
 Minidoka War Relocation Center, Idaho
 Poston War Relocation Center, Arizona
 Rohwer War Relocation Center, Arkansas
 Topaz War Relocation Center, Utah
 Tule Lake War Relocation Center, California

Justice Department detention camps
These camps often held German-American and Italian-American detainees in addition to Japanese Americans:
 Crystal City, Texas
 Fort Lincoln Internment Camp
 Fort Missoula, Montana
 Fort Stanton, New Mexico
 Kenedy, Texas
 Kooskia, Idaho
 Santa Fe, New Mexico
 Seagoville, Texas
 Forest Park, Georgia

Citizen Isolation Centers
The Citizen Isolation Centers were for those considered to be problem inmates.
 Leupp, Arizona
 Moab, Utah (AKA Dalton Wells)
 Fort Stanton, New Mexico (AKA Old Raton Ranch)

Federal Bureau of Prisons
Detainees convicted of crimes, usually draft resistance, were sent to these sites, mostly federal prisons:
 Catalina, Arizona
 Fort Leavenworth, Kansas
 McNeil Island, Washington

U.S. Army facilities
These camps often held German and Italian detainees in addition to Japanese Americans:
 Fort McDowell/Angel Island, California
 Camp Blanding, Florida
 Camp Forrest, Tennessee
 Camp Livingston, Louisiana
 Camp Lordsburg, New Mexico
 Camp McCoy, Wisconsin
 Florence, Arizona
 Fort Bliss, New Mexico and Texas
 Fort Howard, Maryland
 Fort Lewis, Washington
 Fort Meade, Maryland
 Fort Richardson, Alaska
 Fort Sam Houston, Texas
 Fort Sill, Oklahoma
 Griffith Park, California
 Honouliuli Internment Camp, Hawaiʻi
 Sand Island, Hawaiʻi
 Stringtown, Oklahoma

Immigration and Naturalization Service facilities
These immigration detention stations held the roughly 5,500 men arrested immediately after Pearl Harbor, in addition to several thousand German and Italian detainees, and served as processing centers from which the men were transferred to DOJ or Army camps:
 East Boston Immigration Station
 Ellis Island
 Cincinnati, Ohio
 San Pedro, Los Angeles
 Seattle, Washington
 Sharp Park, California
 Tuna Canyon, Los Angeles

See also
 Internment of Japanese Americans

References

Camps
Japanese-American internment camps